Chuquibambilla may mean:

Chuquibambilla, Peru, a town
Chuquibambilla District, Grau Province, Peru